The Cauvery Wildlife Sanctuary is a protected area located in the Mandya, Chamarajanagar and Ramanagar districts of Karnataka, India. The Cauvery River passes through its midst. On its east, it adjoins Dharmapuri forest division of Tamil Nadu state.

Geography
Its eastern and northeastern borders are bounded by the Tamil Nadu state.

Important places along the river stretch flowing through the sanctuary covering its forested central and eastern parts are the Hogenakal Falls (meaning: "smoking rock" in Kannada language), Mekedatu (meaning: "goats leap"), and Sangam (confluence with the Arkavathi River. An important religious centre within the sanctuary is Muthathi Anjaneya temple. Also located within the sanctuary are an ecotourism fishing resort and the Cauvery Fishing Camp at Bhimeshwari.

The sanctuary is managed by the Deputy Conservator of Forests with four wildlife ranges at Kanakapura, Hanur, Cowdally and MM Hills wildlife ranges. The reserve forests, which are part of the sanctuary, are the Basavanabetta S.F, the Chilandavadi S.F, the Muggur S.F, the Chikkayalur S.F, and the Mahadeswara Reserve Forest. The boundary of the sanctuary is well demarcated with the surrounding border areas consisting of agricultural lands and forests; the bordering forest areas are: the Kollegal forest division to its west and south, Mandya and Ramanagaram forest divisions to its north, and Dharmapuri Forest division of Tamil Nadu state to its east.

Human habitation inside the sanctuary and within  radius of the sanctuary consists of eight enclosed villages and 30 villages respectively with a total population of 39,000 whose main occupation is agriculture. Along the boundary of the sanctuary, a trench is excavated to prevent elephant migration to neighbouring villages and to check damage to agricultural lands.

Climate

The sanctuary receives rainfall both during the Northeast monsoon and Southwest monsoon.

Biology and ecology
The sanctuary mainly consists of dry deciduous forest, southern tropical dry thorn and riverine forests. Hardwickia binata and Albizia amara are the dominant forest types. There is hardly any vegetation in the northwestern part while good forests exist in the rest of the sanctuary.

Flora
The dominant species of trees found in this sanctuary are Terminalia arjuna and jambul (Syzygium cumini). Other tree species in the sanctuary are Albizia amara, Feronia sp., Tamarindus indica, Mangifera indica, Hardwickia binata, Acacia armata, and several other species of acacia, Feronia and Ficus.

Fauna

It is home to mammals like the Bengal tiger (Panthera tigris), Indian elephant (Elephas maximus), wild boar (Sus scrofa), Indian leopard (Panthera pardus), dhole, spotted deer (Axis axis), barking deer (Muntiacus muntjak), sambar (Cervus unicolor), four-horned antelope (Tetracerus quadricornis), black-naped hare (Lepus nigricollis), chevrotain, common langur, bonnet macaque, honey badger (ratel) malabar giant squirrel (Ratufa indica maxima), grizzled giant squirrel (Ratufa macroura) which is under the highly endangered category in the state of Karnataka (but under IUCN Red List as near threatened), smooth-coated otter (Lutra lutra) The smooth-coated otter sites in the sanctuary’s river reach were specifically studied. It was noted that the otters inhabited riverine areas which were loosely packed sand and rock without compacted sand, rocks, gravel, and plant cover.

The river Cauvery is also habitat for various species of reptiles like the mugger crocodile (Crocodylus palustris), Indian mud turtles (Chelonia sp.). Reptile species in the sanctuary are Indian rock python (Python molurus), Indian cobra (Naja naja), Russell’s viper (Daboia russelii) and banded krait (Bungarus fasciatus). This is also one of the few places to find the IUCN Red List Critically Endangered  hump-backed mahseer (Tor remadevii ) fish. It was also, previously, part of the distribution of the Critically Endangered  Nilgiri Mystus (Hemibagrus punctatus), known locally as haddu.

Avifauna
The sanctuary is listed as an IBA assessed bird area by the BirdLife International in 2004 which extends over the same semiarid area as the sanctuary. The two most endangered species in the sanctuary are Gyps species of vultures – the white-rumped vulture (Gyps bengalensis) and Indian vulture (Gyps indicus). The four vulnerable species reported are Nilgiri wood-pigeon (Columba elphinstonii), greater spotted eagle (Clanga clanga), white-naped tit (Parus nuchalis) and yellow-throated bulbul (Pycnonotus xantholaemus). Other bird species reported are 25 species of Malayan Tropical Dry Zone which includes the near threatened red-headed vulture (Sarcogyps calvus). Some notable resident species here include brown boobook (Ninox scutulata), white-bellied blue-flycatcher (Cyornis pallipes), stork-billed kingfisher (Pelagorpsis capensis), green imperial-pigeon (Ducula aenea) and Indian scops-owl (Otus bakkamoena).

In a recent bird survey carried out in the sanctuary, reported in January 2014, the total number of bird species identified in the park are 280, which include 19 new species. Some of the notable species reported are: Indian courser, Malabar parakeet, large-billed leaf warbler, green leaf-warbler, western crowned leaf warbler, fairy-bluebird, the Indian blue robin, the yellow-throated bulbul, the crested goshawk, rosefinch, Blyth's swift, Orphean warbler, European bee-eater, and Eurasian crag martin.

There is a very notable, disjunct population of lesser fish-eagles in the sanctuary. This species is harder to find elsewhere across peninsular India.

Threats
The threats faced in the sanctuary have been recorded to be mostly of recent origin and of low intensity. These low level threats are related to farming and fishing activities, use of forest resources in the form of logging, tree harvesting, extraction of minor forest produce, least degree of recreational disturbance from human activities and low level of natural changes in the form of water harvesting structures. Upstream water impoundments have resulted in very low flows even in monsoon seasons, and dam releases introduce cold, low mineral content water at unpredictable times, all of which impact on riverine species. Still, the threats from exploitation of biological resources in the form of hunting and capture of animals is assessed as high.

However, a damming project proposed at Mekedatu now comes as the biggest threat, as it would flood 12,000 acres of forest land, with 7,800 acres of land under the Cauvery Wildlife Sanctuary. This could severely impact the only large population of grizzled giant-squirrels in Karnataka and dwindle the already endangered population of the humpback mahseers and other fish endemic to this shallow riverine habitat. It could as well increase man-animal conflict in the forest regions north and south of the sanctuary, as the region is a vital elephant and tiger corridor. 

Introductions of alien fish species  have put huge pressures on the native fish, especially the most endangered species.

Conservation measures

Conservation measures in force in the sanctuary are in the form of patrolling on foot and in jeeps, and functioning of 11 moving anti-poaching camps; two permanent camps have been proposed. Drinking water to wild animals are provided through building of water conservation structures. Fire lines are cut and burnt well in advance before the beginning of the forest fire season; fire lines are created and dry material burnt. Fire watchers are stationed at strategic locations. A 10-year conservation plan for the period 2006–16 has been instituted. Zoning of forest into Core, Buffer, and Tourism zones has been planned. The tourism zone has four specific areas – Bheemeshwari and Muthathi, Sangam and Mekedatu in the Kanakapura Wildlife Range, Gopinatham and Hogenakal falls of M.M.Hills Wildlife Range. Administrative set up has been proposed to be reorganized with additional staff. Improvement of patrolling paths has been envisaged. To increase awareness among the general public publicity pamphlets are planned, apart from fixing signages and plaques with information on the importance of preservation of wildlife of the sanctuary.

References

South Deccan Plateau dry deciduous forests
Wildlife sanctuaries in Karnataka
1987 establishments in Karnataka
Protected areas established in 1987